Cultural Beira, usually known simply as Cultural, is a traditional association football club based in Beira, Mozambique. They played in the Moçambola, the highest level of football in Mozambique in 1980, finishing 7th out of 8 in the southern group.

References

Beira, Mozambique
Football clubs in Mozambique